Trabala ganesha is a moth of the family Lasiocampidae first described by Walter Karl Johann Roepke in 1951. It is found in Sundaland.

References

Lasiocampidae
Moths described in 1951